The Norwich Anglo-Saxon is an ancient preserved skeleton of the age of around one thousand years, found in Norwich, England. It is a topic of study and interest in regard to the genetic composition of people of that region.

See also
List of DNA-tested mummies

References
Original research paper on the remains 
ISOGG page of the Norwich Anglo-Saxon genetic test results

Archaeology of death
Mummies
Anglo-Saxon archaeology
Objects of historical interest in Norfolk